Swinton is a town in the City of Salford in Greater Manchester, England. southwest of the River Irwell,  northwest of Manchester, adjoining the town of Pendlebury and suburb of Clifton. In 2014, it had a population of 22,931.

Historically in Lancashire, for centuries Swinton was a hamlet in the township of Worsley, parish of Eccles and hundred of Salfordshire. The name Swinton is derived from the Old English "Swynton" meaning "swine town". In the High Middle Ages, Swinton was held by the religious orders of the Knights Hospitaller and Whalley Abbey. Farming was the main occupation, with locals supplementing their incomes by hand-loom woollen weaving in the domestic system.

Collieries opened during the Industrial Revolution and Swinton became an important industrial area with coal providing the fuel for the cotton spinning and brickmaking industries. Bricks from Swinton were used for industrial projects including the Bridgewater Canal, which passes Swinton to the south. The adoption of the factory system facilitated a process of unplanned urbanisation in the area, and by the mid-19th century Swinton was an important mill town and coal mining district at a convergence of factories, brickworks and a newly constructed road and railway network.

Following the Local Government Act 1894, Swinton was united with neighbouring Pendlebury to become an urban district of Lancashire. Swinton and Pendlebury received a charter of incorporation in 1934, giving it honorific borough status. In the same year, the United Kingdom's first purpose-built intercity highway—the major A580 road (East Lancashire Road), which terminates at Swinton and Pendlebury's southern boundary—was officially opened by King George V. Swinton and Pendlebury became part of the City of Salford in 1974. Swinton is the seat of Salford City Council and a commuter town, supported by its transport network and proximity to Manchester city centre.

History
The name Swinton derives from the Old English swin, pigs and tun, an enclosure, farmstead or manor estate. An early form was Swynton.<ref>{{cite web | title=Swinton & Pendlebury - Local History, Salford City Council | url=http://www.salford.gov.uk/living/yourcom/salfordlife/aboutsalford/salfordlocalhistory/localhistory-swintpendle.htm | access-date= 6 August 2003}}</ref>

During the Middle Ages, Swinton belonged to Whalley Abbey. Later, lands at Swinton were granted to Thurston Tyldesley, then of  Wardley Hall. Documents record that certain areas belonged to the Knights Hospitaller.

In 1817 some Swinton weavers joined in the Blanketeers' demonstration and marched to London to put their grievances to the Prince Regent. In 1842 some Swinton people took part in Chartist agitations and tried to destroy a local colliery.

Sunday schools and libraries were established in Swinton at quite an early period. Swinton Industrial School was visited by Charles Dickens. The school was created by the Manchester Poor Law Union. In contrast with other institutions for the poor around that time, which were places of final resort, the Swinton Industrial School was built in response to a more enlightened attitude. The Manchester Poor Law Union saw the value of a place where children could be cared for and educated. The school opened in 1843 and survived until the 1920s. During demolition of the school buildings in the early 1930s, the foundations proved particularly difficult. Finally explosives were used, which resulted in a huge number of rats being disturbed. It was a number of weeks before council workers could remove the rats from the surrounding streets and houses. Huge nests of baby rats were carried out of the rafters of many buildings. The site was used for the present town hall.

Governance

Lying within the historic county boundaries of Lancashire since the early 12th century, Swinton anciently formed part of the hundred of Salford (civil jurisdiction). Swinton was a chapelry in the township of Worsley and ecclesiastical parish of Eccles.

Swinton's first local authority was a local board of health established in 1867. A regulatory body responsible for standards of hygiene and sanitation, it covered Swinton itself and the majority of the neighbouring township of Pendlebury. It changed its name to Swinton and Pendlebury Local Board of Health in 1869. Following the Local Government Act 1894, Swinton became a civil parish, and the area of the local board became Swinton and Pendlebury UD, an urban district of the administrative county of Lancashire. In 1907 there were exchanges of land with the neighbouring Worsley Urban District, and in 1933 most of Clifton and a part of Prestwich Urban District were added to Swinton and Pendlebury. Swinton and Pendlebury received its Charter of Incorporation as a municipal borough from Edward Stanley, 18th Earl of Derby at a ceremony in Victoria Park on 29 September 1934. In 1955 a very small part of Worsley Urban District was added to Swinton and Pendlebury.

Under the Local Government Act 1972, the Municipal Borough of Swinton of Pendlebury was abolished, and Swinton has since 1 April 1974 formed an unparished area of the City of Salford, a metropolitan borough in the metropolitan county of Greater Manchester.HMSO. Local Government Act 1972. 1972 c.70.

Geography

Swinton lies in the west-central part of the Greater Manchester Urban Area, the UK's second largest conurbation. The M60 motorway passes Swinton on its northwest side.

Landmarks
 The architectural centrepiece of the town is the neoclassical Salford Civic Centre, which has a 125-foot (38 m) high clock tower. It was built as Swinton and Pendlebury Town Hall, when Swinton and Pendlebury received its Charter of Incorporation. Before its construction, council meetings were held in Victoria House in Victoria Park, but the borough council required larger premises. A competition was launched to design the new town hall; the winners were architects Percy Thomas and Ernest Prestwich with a design that closely resembled Swansea Guildhall. It later won the RIBA Gold Medal.

The site of the former Swinton Industrial School on Chorley Road was purchased for £12,500 and the foundation stone of the new town hall laid on 16 October 1936. The main builders were J. Gerrard's and Son of Swinton. The town hall opened on 17 September 1938. Extensions were built when it became the administrative headquarters of the City of Salford in 1974

Wardley Hall is an early medieval manor house and a Grade I listed building, and is the official residence of the Roman Catholic bishops of Salford.

Transport
Swinton is served by two railway stations on the Manchester-Southport line.
Swinton railway station is near the town centre on Station Road (B5231), just over the boundary in Pendlebury. The other station is Moorside railway station near the top of Moorside Road, close to its junction with Chorley Road (A6). Until 1974 it was known as Moorside and Wardley railway station.

Several bus lines also run through Swinton, leading to Manchester city centre, Bolton and Trafford, among others.

Sports
 Swinton RLFC has an impressive record in rugby league considering the size of the town. The club's six Championship and three Challenge Cup wins is better than the record of their local rivals Salford RLFC. The club was based just over the local boundary in Pendlebury until 1992, when financial mismanagement necessitated a move from the Station Road ground to play at Gigg Lane in Bury. The financial failure of main creditor and de facto owner Hugh Eaves in 2002 put the future of the club in jeopardy and it spent a short time regrouping at Moor Lane in Kersal, as tenants of Salford City F.C. From 2003, the Lions played home games at Park Lane, Whitefield, home of Sedgley Park RUFC. In 2006, the club acquired land to build a 6,000 capacity stadium with training facilities and community use in Agecroft, Pendlebury. After ground-sharing with Leigh and Salford, the club moved to Heywood Road, Sale, home of Sale Rugby Union F.C. for the 2016 season onwards.

Swinton based junior association football side Deans F.C. was the starting point in the career of Ryan Giggs, who grew up in neighbouring Pendlebury and went on to become a Manchester United player, and also of Dean Holden.

Schools

Primary
 Mossfield Primary School
 Broadoak Primary School
 The Deans Primary School
 Grosvenor Road Primary School
 Moorside Primary School
 St Charles' RC Primary School
 St Mary's RC Primary School
 St Peter's CE Primary School
 Wardley CE Primary School

St Peter's CE Primary School

St Peter's CE Primary School (
) is a Church of England primary school located on Vicarage Road, Swinton; it is next to St Peter's Church and is a two-minute walk from Swinton Shopping Centre. The school is also located near Salford Civic Centre (formerly Swinton and Pendlebury Town Hall).

St Peter's School is split into two areas, Juniors and Infants. Like most primary schools in England, St. Peter's caters to children aged 3 to 11 (Years 1 to 6). In January 2011 the school placed 12th in the list of most popular primary schools in the city of Salford, with there being 30 places available with 40 parents listing the school as the first choice for their children leaving a surplus of 10 children. St Peter's is a feeder school for Moorside High School. At the time of the previous inspection children's skills on entry to the Nursery were below average but they have declined since then and are now well below average.

St. Peter's C. E. Primary School was not originally on the site that it now sits upon (the original 19th century school was where the Swinton Shopping Centre now stands). It was a much smaller school and therefore a much bigger building was needed. The current building started being constructed in 1905 and the work was finished in 1906. The school first opened its doors 1906 and has remained virtually unchanged ever since.

The school is subject to frequent outbreaks of vandalism and theft of outdoor and computer equipment. The school made the news in August 2016 when it was discovered that, James King, a teacher and head of year at the school had been stealing laptops and iPads to fund a gambling habit; in total he took the devices into different pawnbrokers to gain £1,620. He has since been banned from teaching indefinitely.

The school achieved:
Basic Skills Quality Mark in November 2005. 
Healthy Schools Award in spring 2006 and the Artsmark Silver Award in May 2006.

School productions have included Joseph and the Amazing Technicolor Dreamcoat, performed in 2001, Alice in Wonderland, performed in 2002 and Oliver!, performed in 2003. The school staged another prefromance of Joseph and the Amazing Technicolor Dreamcoat in 2008 to say farewell to the then Headteacher, Mrs Walker as this was the first performance she experienced at the school.

Notable former pupils include:
 Brett Cullen, Groot's stunt double in Guardians of the Galaxy Two.
 CBBC Presenter Chris Johnson who attended between 2000 and 2002, Who went on to attend Moorside High School.
 Salford City Radio Presenter Lewis Ryan who attended until 2002, Who also went on to attend Moorside High School.

Secondary
Moorside High School, Deans Road, Swinton
St Ambrose Barlow RC High School, Ash Drive, Wardley, Swinton
Co-op Academy Swinton

Churches
St Peter's C of E, Chorley Road, Swinton
All Saints' C of E, Charles Street, Swinton
Holy Rood C of E, Moorside Road, Swinton
St Charles' RC, Moorside Road, Swinton
United Reformed, Worsley Road, Swinton
Worsley Road Methodist, Worsley Road, Swinton
Latter-Day Saints, Partington Lane, Swinton
Bethesda Hall, Worsley Road, Swinton
Manchester Road Methodist, Manchester Road, Swinton
Jehovah's Witnesses, Swinton Hall Road, Swinton

Notable people

 Composer Sir Peter Maxwell Davies, previously Master of the Queen's Music, was brought up in Swinton after his family moved from Salford when he was four. In 1998, he wrote Swinton Jig'', an orchestral work inspired by the sounds and traditional melodies heard in Swinton during his childhood.
 Composer and pianist Roger Smalley was born in Swinton in 1943.
 Cricketer Charles Woods (1878–1940) was born in Swinton.

See also

 Listed buildings in Swinton and Pendlebury
 Victoria Park, Swinton

References

Notes

Bibliography

External links

Salford City Council's history for Swinton
Salford City Council's local information for Swinton
Swinton and Pendlebury dedicated website
  Queensmere Heritage trail dedicated site
St Peter's Church of England Primary School official site

 
Geography of Salford
Towns in Greater Manchester